Imo Awka festival (Imo Oka or Imoka festival)  is an ancient cultural event that is celebrated annually by the people of Awka kingdom in the month of May in order to venerate their gods. Imo-Oka shrine is symbolic and it is denoted by the special white-bellied monkey, widely respected and revered as the messengers of the shrine.

The festival is basically celebrated to appreciate the Imoka god, for her favours and to request for much better years ahead. The festival allows for the people of Awka to look inward and thank the Imoka god for shielding them from external invasion and to pray for peace and prosperity of the town.

History 
The Imo Awka festival emanated from the worship of the greatest male god revered in Awka, known to be Imoka deity. The Imo Awka festival could be traced back to ancient times during the times Awka people were always attacked and threatened by their neighbours. One of their terrifying oppressor was King Okoli Ijeoma of Ndikelionwu, who planned to attack their land. On getting to know about  the planned invasion by King Okoli, the elders of the land sent out delegates to Akoto, a land known to be full of potent herbal doctors, to invite one of them who would develop a charm that would fortify the Awka warriors.
They returned with a renowned herbal doctor by name Okoyeke. He prepared the charm to fortify their warriors but warned them that the charm must be venerated by the community to become effective. The Imoka is described as a protective medicine that aid them to fight their enemies. Monkeys were dedicated to the Imoka deity because when Nwafia people laid siege to attack the people of Awka, the Imoka gods sent his emissaries the monkeys in the forest to inform them of attack. They sense the danger and repelled the attack and defeated their enemies. Hence it became a taboo to kill or eat the meat of monkeys until date with severe consequences.

All these events resulted to the worship of the CHARM-god Imoka( the Avenger god of Awka people). Therefore, the Imo Awka festival was initiated to commensurate the worship.

Festivity 
The Imo Awka festival is a two weeks events that commence with the females paying homage to Imoka, dancing the Opu Eke dance. The first day of the festival is always on Avbo (Afor) market day and on the evening of the Oye market day preceding the feast, the trumpet was blown, the Abia drum beaten and Ikolo Imoka sounded to marshal in Egwu Imoka.

The festival features four major events, the Ede-Mmuo, Ogwu Oghugha, Eqwu Opu-Eke and Egwu Imo-Oka. The Imo Awka festival showcases several kinds of masquerades that displays at the Imoka shrine. In 2019, it was observed that masquerades that has never been featured  before were there which added more liveliness to the festival.

There is an interesting part of the festival that features beating of canes called  Nro-Nta between two male groups. They simply flog themselves until one refuses to beat back and surrenders. This mock battle is usually beating male folks but the female folk could watch. The essence of the battle is to test one's strength and endurance of pain. The festival concludes with visiting the Imo-Oka stream on the final day which is heralded by a heavy downpour of rain that falls in the late afternoon. In 2020, the festival was suspended due to the coronavirus pandemic and the ban on social gatherings by the World Health Organisation and the Nigeria Centre for Disease Control.

References 

Festivals in Nigeria
Cultural festivals in Nigeria
Igbo culture